James Edward Cottrell is the Chair Emeritus, Department of Anesthesiology at SUNY Downstate Medical Center in New York City. He serves as a member of the New York State Board of Regents and is an avid collector of contemporary fine-art.

Dr. Cottrell helped to found the subspecialty of neuroanesthesiology, a field of medicine that has refined and expanded clinical practice and increased patient safety.

Honors
2016 Leadership Award From the Arthur Ashe Institute for Urban Health
2010 Elite Distinguished Service Award from the American Society of Anesthesiologists
2007 Rovenstine Lecturer, American Society of Anesthesiologists
2005 Fellow, Royal College of Anaesthetists
2003 President, American Society of Anesthesiologists
2003 Honorary Member, German Society of Anaesthesiology and Intensive Care Medicine
1993 Honorary Member, Belgium Society for Anaesthesia and Reanimation
1988 Editor-in-Chief, Journal of Neurosurgical Anesthesiology

Community service
2001 Vice Chairman, Board of Directors, Doctors of the World
1989 Chairman and Founding Member, AIDS Action Foundation
Board of Directors, God's Love We Deliver

Books
"Cottrell and Patel's Neuroanesthesia" (with Piyush Patel MD, 520 pages, Elsevier, 6th edition 2016)
"Handbook of Neuroanesthesia" (with Philippa Newfield, 480 pages, Lippincott Williams & Wilkins, 5th edition, 2012)
"Cottrell and Young's Neuroanesthesia" (with William L. Young, 480 pages, Mosby-Year Book, 5th edition, 2010)
"Anesthesia and Neurosurgery" (with William L. Young, Elsevier, 5th edition, 2009)
"Handbook of Neuroanesthesia" (with Philippa Newfield, 448 pages, Lippincott Williams & Wilkins, 4th edition, 2006)
"Anesthesia and Neurosurgery" (with David S. Smith, 860 pages, Mosby-Year Book, 4th edition, 2001)
"Under the Mask" (with Stephanie Golden, 294 pages, Rutgers University Press, 1st edition, 2001)
"Handbook of Neuroanesthesia" (with Paul Henry Young & John A. Mcculloch, 431 pages, Lippincott Williams & Wilkins, 3rd edition, 1999)
"Anesthesia and Neurosurgery" (with David S. Smith, 798 pages, Mosby-Year Book, 3rd edition, 1994)
"Handbook of Neuroanesthesia" (with Philippa Newfield, 458 pages, Lippincott Williams & Wilkins, 2nd edition, 1991)
"Anesthesia and Neurosurgery" (with Herman Turndorf, 530 pages, Mosby-Year Book, 2nd edition, 1986)
"Handbook of Neuroanesthesia" (with Philippa Newfield, 437 pages, Little, Brown and Company, 1st edition, 1983)
"Occupational Hazards to Operating and Recovery Room Personnel. International Anesthesiology Clinics. Vol. 19, No. 4 (Winter)." (183 pages, Little, Brown, and Company, 1981)
"Anesthesia and Neurosurgery" (with Herman Turndorf, 443 pages, Mosby-Year Book, 1st edition, 1980)

Publications

Art
Dr. Cottrell and his partner, Joseph Lovett, began collecting art in the 1970s and have built an exceptional collection of contemporary art. Their collection has a particular depth because they build relationships with artists and stick with them as their work develops. "As collectors, they're very involved in getting to know the artists they collect," says Orlando Museum of Art curator Hansen Mulford. In 2001 they were listed among Art & Antiques Top 100 Collectors.

Cottrell has served on the Director's Council of the Whitney Museum of American Art and on the Prix Marcel Duchamp and Guerlain Drawing Prize Selection Committees.

In 2021 a major gift from Dr. James Cottrell and Mr. Joseph Lovett of over 200 artworks was announced by Grey Art Gallery at New York University. A named Cottrell-Lovett Gallery and the creation of the Cottrell-Lovett Study Center were included in the announcement.

References

External links
Cottrell-Lovett Art Collection

Anesthesia Without Fear

West Virginia University alumni
Morris Harvey College alumni
Fellows of the Royal College of Anaesthetists
American anesthesiologists
Year of birth missing (living people)
Living people
People from West Virginia